Available bit rate (ABR) is a service used in ATM networks when source and destination don't need to be synchronized. ABR does not guarantee against delay or data loss. ABR mechanisms allow the network to allocate the available bandwidth fairly over the present ABR sources. ABR is one of five service categories defined by the ATM Forum for use in an ATM Network. 

The network switches use locally available information to determine the explicit allowable rates or relative rate (increase/decrease) for the source. The newly calculated rates are then being sent to the sources using resource management records (RM-cells). RM-cells are generated by the source and travel along the data path to the destination and sent back. ABR sets a minimum cell rate (MCR) and a peak cell rate (PCR). When transfers exceed the PCR, cells are dropped.

Many implementers consider ABR to be overly complex, and its adoption has been modest.

See also

External links 
Understanding the Available Bit Rate (ABR) Service Category for ATM VCs

Network protocols